The ARIA Digital Track Chart is a chart that ranks the best-performing digital tracks singles of Australia. It is published by Australian Recording Industry Association (ARIA), an organisation who collect music data for the weekly ARIA Charts. To be eligible to appear on the chart, the recording must be a single not an EP and only paid downloads counted from downloadable outlets.

Chart history

Number-one artists

See also
2019 in music
ARIA Charts
List of number-one singles of 2019 (Australia)

References

Australia Digital Tracks
Digital 2019
Number-one Digital Songs